Martin Ebbertz (born 1962 in Aachen, Nordrhein-Westfalen, West Germany) is a German writer of children's books.

He grew up in Pruem (Eifel), and studied Germanistik, Philosophy, and History in Freiburg, Münster and Frankfurt. He lived and worked as a free-lance writer first in Frankfurt/Main, then five years in Thessaloniki, Greece. Since Spring 2000 Martin Ebbertz has lived with his wife and two children in Boppard on the Rhine River. In addition to being a writer, he is also a flea market dealer and a second-hand bookseller.

His first children's book Josef, der zu den Indianern will appeared in 1992. His best known book is Der kleine Herr Jaromir, which was also translated into Dutch and Chinese. Many of his children's stories were also published in the German literary radio program broadcast Ohrenbär.

Bibliography

Poetry & Prose 
 Der schönste Platz von Teneriffa. Sports stories. Verlag Am Erker, 1988
 Vier Jahrzehnte Eremiten-Presse. History of a publishing house. Chronicle. Eremiten-Presse 1989
 Alltagsrezepte. Edition Razamba, 2008
 Bestiarium Nonsens. A small lexicon of the most important really strange animal species. Edition Razamba, 2009
 Das Fressverhalten der Mäuse. Stories. Edition Razamba, 2011

Children's Book 
 Josef, der zu den Indianern will. Anrich Verlag, 1992
 Der blaue Hut und der gelbe Kanarienvogel. Verlag St. Gabriel, 1995
 Der kleine Herr Jaromir. Patmos, 2002.
 Onkel Theo erzählt vom Pferd – und 26 weitere total verrückte Geschichten. Moses, 2004
 Karlo, Seefahrer an Land. Coppenrath, 2007
 Pech und Glück eines Brustschwimmers. Sauerländer, 2008
 Der kleine Herr Jaromir findet das Glück. Sauerländer 2008
 Paula, die Leseratte. Razamba 2010

Audiobook 
 Armes Ferkel Anton.  Deutsche Grammophon, 1998

Awards 
 1999 "Kinderhörbuch des Monats" (children's audiobook of the month) to Armes Ferkel Anton
 2002 SR/RB Bestenliste Kinder- und Jugendliteratur (List of best children's literature)
 2002 "Deutsche Akademie für Kinder- und Jugendliteratur" (German Academy for Children's and Young People's Literature, in Volkach): Kinderbuch des Monats
 2002 ”Die besten 7 – Bücher für junge Leser", Deutschlandfunk and Focus
 2005 "Deutsche Akademie für Kinder- und Jugendliteratur": Kinderbuch des Monats (children's book of the month)
 2006 Belgian Youth Literature Prize (nominationlist)
 2008 SR/RB Bestenliste Kinder- und Jugendliteratur

External links
 
 Homepage (English)
 Martin Ebbertz in NRW Literatur im Netz

References 

1962 births
Living people
German children's writers
German male writers